Ulrich Johannes Schneider (born 4 May 1956, Gelnhausen) is a German librarian and historian of philosophy. Since 2005 he has been the director of the Leipzig University Library.

External links
Books on and by Schneider in the Deutschen Nationalbibliothek
Homepage of Ulrich Johannes Schneider
Schneider on the Leipzig University Library page

References

Living people
German librarians
Academic staff of Leipzig University
German historians of philosophy
1956 births
German male non-fiction writers